Huang Xihua (born  1966) is a Chinese politician and a representative of the Guangdong region in the National People's Congress of China.

Huang graduated from the Jiangxi Agricultural University majoring in soil. Huang is a member of the Chinese Communist Party. He served as the director of the Tourism Bureau of Huizhou in Guangdong. He later served as the Deputy Secretary-General of Huizhou's municipal government. Huang has been a deputy to the National People's Congress since 2008. In 2013, he served as a deputy to the NPC. Huang advocates for the cancellation of birth restrictions and for the liberalization of childbirth in China. On February 24, 2018, Huang was elected as a representative of the 13th National People's Congress.

References 

Delegates to the 13th National People's Congress
Delegates to the 11th National People's Congress
Delegates to the 12th National People's Congress
Jiangxi Agricultural University alumni
Living people
Year of birth missing (living people)